Mike Stokey (September 14, 1918 – September 7, 2003) was an American game show host and producer, best known for Pantomime Quiz and its later incarnation Stump the Stars. He also produced early TV specials, including A Christmas Carol in 1949, for the Jerry Fairbanks Company. Stokey also hosted Beat the Odds while it was presented at KTLA.

His former wife (1943-1948) was actress Pamela Blake, with whom he had one son, Mike Stokey II, and a daughter, Barbara.
His second wife (1955 - ?) was actress Spring Mitchell, born Neola Buxton in Lansing, MI with whom he had daughter, Susan Stokey and grandchildren Juliette Goglia, Dante Goglia and Emily Goglia.

Stokey died from complications from liver disease on September 7, 2003 (seven days before his 85th birthday) in Las Vegas.

References

External links

 

1918 births
2003 deaths
American game show hosts